Fernand Fayolle (21 July 1904 – 18 September 1997) was a French racing cyclist. He rode in the 1928 Tour de France.

References

External links
 

1904 births
1997 deaths
French male cyclists
Place of birth missing